Justice Prashant Kumar (1 July 1958 – 30 August 2019) was an Indian Judge. He was the former Acting Chief Justice of Jharkhand High Court. He was also former Judge of Jharkhand High Court and Allahabad High Court.

References 

Indian judges
Living people
1958 births